Lick Run Plantation is a historic home and related outbuildings located at Bedington, Berkeley County, West Virginia.  The complex consists of a two-story stone dwelling, stone kitchen, and stone barn and corn crib.  They were built after Peter Light purchased the property in 1770.  Also on the property are a log house built before 1770, and the stone Bedinger Mill.  The mill building was built about 1816.

It was listed on the National Register of Historic Places in 1984.

References

Houses on the National Register of Historic Places in West Virginia
Georgian architecture in West Virginia
Houses completed in 1774
Houses in Berkeley County, West Virginia
Plantation houses in West Virginia
National Register of Historic Places in Berkeley County, West Virginia
Plantations in West Virginia